Cristian Andrés Basaure Urzúa (born 18 March 1981) was a Chilean footballer.

He played for Deportes La Serena in 2013.

As were Honorino Landa, Felix Landa, Adelmo Yori, Pedro García Barros, and José Luis Sierra, he was an alumnus of Hispan American School.

References

External links
 BDFA profile

1981 births
Living people
Chilean footballers
Santiago Morning footballers
Audax Italiano footballers
Club Deportivo Palestino footballers
Puerto Montt footballers
Magallanes footballers
C.D. Arturo Fernández Vial footballers
Primera B de Chile players
Chilean Primera División players
Chilean people of French descent
Chilean people of Basque descent
Association football defenders
Canal del Fútbol color commentators
Chilean association football commentators